Mazama High School is a public high school in Altamont, Oregon, United States, near Klamath Falls.

References

High schools in Klamath County, Oregon
Public high schools in Oregon